Lee Patterson ( Beverly Frankels Atherly Patterson; March 31, 1929 – February 14, 2007) was a Canadian film and television actor.

Life and career
Patterson was born in Vancouver, British Columbia, as Beverly Frankels Atherly Patterson. He attended the Ontario College of Art and Design.

British career
He moved to the UK, where he specialised in playing virile American types in British films. He appeared in a number of films during the 1950s and 1960s, including The Good Die Young (1954), Above Us the Waves (1955), Reach for the Sky (1956), The Key Man (1957), Time Lock (1957) The Golden Disc (1958), 
Cat & Mouse (1958), Jack the Ripper (1959) and The 3 Worlds of Gulliver (1960). He left but returned to the UK to appear as hard-bitten navigation expert Captain Randolph Southard in the play version of The Caine Mutiny Court Martial at The Queen's Theatre, London, directed by Charlton Heston in 1985.

American TV
After moving to the USA in the early 1960s, Patterson worked mainly in television. In 1960, he was cast in two episodes of the ABC/Warner Brothers western television series The Alaskans, starring Roger Moore. Patterson played Tom Kirk in the episode "Behind the Moon" and Jeff Warren in "Sign of the Kodiak", a reference to the Kodiak bear. Later that year, he was cast as the fictional detective Dave Thorne in another ABC/WB series, Surfside 6, set on a houseboat anchored at Miami Beach, Florida, which co-starred Van Williams, Troy Donahue, Diane McBain and Margarita Sierra.

He also appeared in 1965 on the fourth season of Combat! as an O.S.S Officer, Captain Howard in the episode "9 Place Vendee".

Early in 1966, Patterson appeared as Dan Thorne in the Perry Mason episode "The Case of the Midnight Howler".

Later career
Patterson appeared in daytime serials prior to 1970. His first soap opera role was that of Brad Kiernan in ABC's The Nurses. After that show was cancelled in 1967, he joined the original cast of One Life to Live, a move that reunited him with Doris Quinlan, the producer of The Nurses.

Patterson remained in One Life to Live until 1970, when his character Joe Riley was presumed dead; he returned to the show in 1972 and remained the romantic lead until 1979, when he left due to his unhappiness with the direction the show took after Doris Quinlan left to produce NBC's troubled serial The Doctors. 

Patterson then joined the cast of NBC's Another World and Texas in the role of Dr. Kevin Cooke. The character began in Another World, but moved to Texas when that show began on August 4, 1980. He stayed until 1981, when the show was revamped to bring up its poor ratings against the number-one daytime program, ABC's General Hospital. Texas was cancelled in 1982. Patterson returned to One Life to Live as Joe's twin brother, Tom Dennison, from 1986 until 1988.

He also continued to make appearances in other television shows such as War and Remembrance, Magnum, P.I. and The A-Team, and appeared in movies including Chato's Land (1972) and Airplane II: The Sequel (1982). His last role was as Sergeant Gaylor in the 1994 film Healer.

Death
Patterson died in Galveston, Texas, of congestive heart failure with complications from lung cancer and emphysema, on 14 February 2007; he was aged 77. His death was not reported for nearly a year.

Selected filmography

 Malta Story (1953) - Officer on Back of Truck (uncredited)
 Meet Mr. Lucifer (1953) - American Sailor (uncredited)
 36 Hours (1953) - Joe (uncredited)
 The Good Die Young (1954) - Tod Maslin
 Diamond Expert (1954)
 The Passing Stranger (1954) - Chick
 Above Us the Waves (1955) - Cox
 Faccia da mascalzone (1956)
 Soho Incident (aka Spin a Dark Web) (1956) - Jim Bankley
 Reach for the Sky (1956) - Turner
 Dry Rot (1956) - Danby
 Checkpoint (1956) - Johnny Carpenter
 The Counterfeit Plan (1957) - Duke
 The Key Man (1957) - Lionel Hulme
 The Story of Esther Costello (1957) - Harry Grant
 Time Lock (1957) - Colin Walker
 Natlogi betalt (1957) - Johnny Williams
 The Flying Scot (1957) - Ronnie
 The Golden Disc (1958) - Harry Blair
 The Spaniard's Curse (1958) - Mark Brett
 Man with a Gun (1958) - Mike Davies
 The Desperate Men (aka Cat & Mouse) (1958) - Rod Fenner
 Breakout (1959) - George Munro
 Jack the Ripper (1959) - Sam Lowry
 Deadly Record (1959) - Trevor Hamilton
 The White Trap (1959) - Paul Langley
 Third Man on the Mountain (1959) - Klaus Wesselhoft
 Please Turn Over (1959) - Rod, the Wrestler (uncredited)
 October Moth (1960) - Finlay
 The 3 Worlds of Gulliver (1960) - Reldresal
 The Ceremony (1963) - Nicky
 The Search for the Evil One (1969) - Becker
 Chato's Land (1972) - George Dunn
 Airplane II: The Sequel (1982) - Phoenix Six Captain
 Death Wish 3 (1985) - TV Newscaster
 Bullseye! (1990) - Darrell Hyde
 Healer (1994) - Sergeant Gaylor (final film role)

References

External links

Clips from Texas episodes

1929 births
2007 deaths
Canadian male film actors
Canadian male soap opera actors
Canadian male television actors
Male actors from Los Angeles
Male actors from Vancouver
Warner Bros. contract players
People from Galveston, Texas
Deaths from lung cancer
Deaths from emphysema
Deaths from cancer in Texas